is the nineteenth studio album by Japanese rock band Buck-Tick. It was released on June 4, 2014. It finished 4th on the Oricon weekly chart, and also Billboard Japan, with 18,376 copies sold. The album was created with a concept of surrealism and features many references to Dada, Avant-garde, the Cabaret Voltaire and others. According to Hisashi Imai, the title of the album is actually a subtitle only, the main title is a long blank space, indicating that "it is something that cannot be seen, heard, read, or written. Impossible to pronounce. A thing that is not metaphysical."

Track listing

Personnel
Buck-Tick
 Atsushi Sakurai – vocals
 Hisashi Imai – guitar
 Hidehiko Hoshino – guitar
 Yutaka Higuchi – bass
 Toll Yagami – drums

References

2014 albums
Buck-Tick albums
Japanese-language albums